The Inbestigators (stylised The InBESTigators) is an Australian mockumentary children's television series created by Robyn Butler and Wayne Hope. The show stars Abby Bergman, Anna Cooke, Aston Droomer and Jamil Smyth-Secka as Ava Andrikides, Maudie Miller, Ezra Banks and Kyle Klimson, respectively, fifth-graders who solve crimes in their school and neighbourhood. The series has the comic tone of Little Lunch (another series on which they had worked) and an air of mystery. The show aired in two series from 21 June to 30 November 2019 on ABC Me. Netflix released the first and second series in mid-2019 and early 2020 respectively.

The Inbestigators garnered critical acclaim, with praise for its humour and cast, though its characters drew mixed opinions. The show received two AACTA Award nominations for Best Children's Television Series. A spin-off web series, The InBESTigators: Crime Crack, was released in July 2019; a cast Q&A was released in late 2019, followed by a study guide during the COVID-19 pandemic.

Premise
The series is centred around Ezra Banks, a tech-savvy boy; Maudie Miller, a socially-awkward, intelligent aspiring private investigator; Ava Andrikides, an outgoing, dramatic girl; and Kyle Klimson, an athletic goof. They form the Inbestigators, a detective agency that solves crimes in their school and neighbourhood. After a case is solved, they describe it on a vlog.

Cast

Main
Abby Bergman as Ava Andrikides, an outgoing, social and dramatic girl who loves throwing parties and raising money for charity
Anna Cooke as Maudie Miller, a socially-awkward, intelligent aspiring private investigator who solves most of the Inbestigators' cases
Aston Droomer as Ezra Banks, a tech-savvy, precocious boy
Jamil Smyth-Secka as Kyle Klimson, an athletic goof-off who is forgetful and easily distracted

Recurring
Maria Angelico as Miss Tan, a clumsy but passionate grade-five teacher
Clarke Richards as Mr Barker, a laid-back grade-six teacher
James Saunders as Mr McGillick, the strict, tidy school principal
Eliza Ong as Poppy Banks, Ezra's younger sister, who occasionally helps him report cases
Hannah Johnston as Amelia, one of Ava's friends, who is often left out
Hana Leigh Struckett as Pixie, Ava's forgetful best friend
Madeline Jevic as Mrs Parides, the school's P. E. teacher
Zac Mineo as James, an arrogant, rude student
Ayiana Ncube as Ruby, one of Ava's friends, who is afraid of heights
Zakariah Rahalli as Mario, one of Kyle's friends
Ethan Pham as Diet, a grade-five student who is good at maths
Matilda Hardwick as Caitlin, one of Ava's friends, who wears glasses
Sienna Foggy as Esther, one of Ava's friends
Bailey McMillan-Power as Justin, a grade-five student whose parents often do his homework
Soraya Briggs as Max, one of Ava's friends, who is claustrophobic
Marita Wilcox as Mrs. Maniaci, Ezra's often-impatient neighbour
Jack Goodsell as Archie, one of Kyle's friends
Frank Woodley as Brian, Maudie's father
Monty Henderson as Toby, Diet's best friend
Kayleigh O'Dwyer as Dayani, a grade-six student who wants to be a professional basketball player
Milla Bishop as Miranda, an arrogant girl who thinks she is famous because she appeared in a commercial when she was younger
Shayne Warren as Paul, a rude grade-six student

Development

The InBESTigators is based on an original idea by Robyn Butler. It was created by Robyn Butler and Wayne Hope, who are also known for Little Lunch. After the success of Little Lunch, Butler and Hope wanted to create another children's comedy. For The Inbestigators, they "took the comic tone of Little Lunch and married with it the private detective, mystery genre". Butler explained that she and Hope created the show as a reaction to the "world [they are] living in", which she considered toxic and affected children's viewpoints. In response, she decided to make a show about kids with "ethnic diversity and gender equity and respect and integrity and kindness" to encourage "something else" in children. Screen Australia head of production Sally Callan said, "It's vital that young Australians are able to see their country, their stories and hear their accent reflected on the screen ... The characters in The InBESTigators ... are distinctive and inclusive, and tell stories that are innovative and culturally significant." In June 2018, ABC and Screen Australia greenlit the series. Development was funded by the Australian Children's Television Foundation (ACTF) and ABC.

Writing for The Inbestigators, by Robyn Butler, Wayne Hope, Molly Daniels, Lisa Marie Corso, Maddy Butler, Jayden Masciulli and Bob Franklin, began in 2017. Butler and Hope instructed the writers to keep the scripts clear and simple without dumbing them down, and to ensure that the children's dialogue was child-like: "Rather than writing what was funny or nostalgic for them, they had to get into the bones of a 10-year-old."

After the scripts were written, the team began to focus on the main cast; they sought talent and confidence. After 715 auditions, newcomers Aston Droomer, Anna Cooke, Abby Bergman and Jamil Smyth-Secka were cast as Ezra Banks, Maudie Miller, Ava Andrikides and Kyle Klimson. The series used many children in guest roles, most of whom had auditioned for the main roles. Cooke heard about auditions for The Inbestigators through her school newsletter. She thought it "looked [like] fun", and attended "three or four auditions". For the role, she cut her hair short. In the auditions, Bergman learnt and performed lines for the casting agency. She attended four auditions, the last of which was the chemistry read. Droomer's agency, Emma Raciti Management, sent an audition request for his role in The Inbestigators. Before the first audition, he needed to learn two scripts; for the following auditions he learnt more scripts, met with the series' creators and did a chemistry read.

The Inbestigators used a single-camera setup. To create 40 episodes, the production team required outside funding, which Netflix provided. Production was originally scheduled for July to November 2018. Filming began on 19 July 2018 at Moorabbin Primary School in Melbourne, and the wrap date was pushed back to December. The children worked for eight hours a day, with ten-minute breaks each hour and tutoring on set. Filming wrapped in November. Dan Maxwell was the series' photography director, and Simon McCutcheon was its production designer. The creators originally wanted to create the detective-agency set at their Port Melbourne production office; realising that travel would be difficult, however, they built it in the staff car park. Episodes were not filmed chronologically; scenes at the same location were shot together. There was a one-week break between filming of the first and second series. They needed to be filmed simultaneously due to the child actors' rapid growth.

Themes

The Inbestigators focusses on themes of honesty, loyalty, kindness, friendship, teamwork and responsibility. According to TV Tonight, instead of "nasty adult vices", the show's crimes are justified by desires to fit in or avoid loneliness. When caught, culprits apologise and learn a lesson or moral, which, according to Common Sense Media, are pertinent to tweens.

Episodes

Series overview

Series 1 (2019)
</onlyinclude>

Series 2 (2019)

Release
Each episode of The Inbestigators is approximately 15 minutes long. The series premiered on ABC Me in Australia and New Zealand on 21 June 2019. The first series' broadcast ended on 10 July 2019. It was renewed for a second series on 12 August, which was broadcast from 11 November to 30 November 2019. The first and second series were released worldwide on Netflix on 9 August 2019 and 10 January 2020 respectively. On the streaming service, episodes are presented in pairs, totalling 30 minutes each.

It will premiere on WildBrainTV in Canada on March 10, 2022.

Reception

Critical response
The Inbestigators has received critical acclaim. The show has been listed as one of Netflix's best Australian, detective, educational, and children's series by Screen Rant, The Cinemaholic, Variety and Stuff respectively.

The show's comical aspects attracted praise. Reviewers found the series hilarious and "genuinely funny". Decider Joel Keller said "[i]t's got a sharp sense of humour with a lot of gentle snarkiness". He and Common Sense Media writer Mandie Caroll argued adults would enjoy The Inbestigators due to its comical aspects. In addition, critics thought the Australian actors had a natural approach to comedy. Caroll described their line deliveries as "often dripping with kid-friendly sarcasm and good-natured humour"; Keller assured that the show would be of lower quality with British or American actors. Additionally, reviewers lauded the racial diversity.

Journalists have had mixed opinions on the characters. They deemed the characters stereotypical; critics believed they matched tropes such as the geek and the jock. Despite this, Mumtaj Begum of The Star stated the show's writing and liveliness made such stereotypes less irritating. Aside from the clichés, Carrol considered the characters "[l]ikeable, interesting ... [and] role-model worthy". She also praised the show for breaking gender stereotypes.

Awards and nominations

Other media
The InBESTigators: Crime Crack, a short web series, was released on ABC Me's YouTube channel. The series, starring Abby Bergman as Ava Andrikides and Anna Cooke as Maudie Miller, recounts each episode in six steps: the crime, the red herrings, the culprit, the clues, the motive and the moral of the story. Two episodes were released on 18 July 2019, based on the first series' second and fifth episods.

On 13 September 2019, a cast Q&A webinar for primary-school students was announced by the Australian Children's Television Foundation; the webinar premiered on 22 November 2019. Schools in Queensland, New South Wales, South Australia and Victoria participated in the Q&A, which featured cast members Anna Cooke, Abby Bergman, Aston Droomer and Jamil Smyth-Secka. It was released on YouTube on 18 December 2019. A study guide, The InBESTigators Teaching Toolkit, was released in May 2020 during the COVID-19 pandemic.

Notes

References
  Text was copied/adapted from the Episode Guide at The Inbestigators Wiki, which is released under a CC-BY-SA 3.0 license.

External links

2010s Australian comedy television series
2019 Australian television series debuts
2019 Australian television series endings
Australian Broadcasting Corporation original programming
Australian children's mystery television series
Australian mockumentary television series
English-language Netflix original programming
Netflix children's programming
Television series about children
Television shows about crime
Television shows set in Melbourne